Rahul Ranade (born 23 May 1966) is a music composer. His work in music spans from composing music for films, television, drama to events, concerts, composing music for ballets, advertisements, and also albums.

Early life
Rahul started his musical journey at a very young age. He has been trained in percussion (tabla) and has received vocal lessons in Indian Classical. Thanks to the encouragement from his mother, he continued to pursue his passion for music even thru his college days. He soon received accolades and wet is beak in real music at "Shishuranjan". At a very tender age, he got the opportunity to perform and tour with the troupe of Ghashiram Kotwal (Marathi: घाशीराम कोतवाल) along with eminent personalities like Dr. Mohan Agashe nd Dr. Jabbar Patel. Rahul has been privileged to learn from virtuosos like  Sai Paranjpye, Rajdutt, Srinivas Khale and Ketan Mehta.

Personal life
Rahul is married to Meena Ranade. She has a B.Com/MBA and now has her own marketing firm, Mirage Creations. Rahul and Meena have two sons, Yash who is a practicing attorney of law (Duke University School of Law) and Jay who is an avid writer and a Hotel Management graduate (IHM).

Musical Associations

Rahul has been one of the founders for Grips Theater, Pune - associated with Grip Theater, Germany. He also acts as a visiting faculty at the Film and Television Institute of India Pune, Whistling Woods, Pune University, FLAME, and National School of Drama. 
 Music Composers Association of India - Committee and Board of Directors
 ArtsGurukul, India
 The Indian Performing Right Society Limited

Selected Discography 
Rahul’s musical compositions have highlighted more than 35 films including Nidaan, Vaastav, Astitva, Saatchya Aat Gharaat, Kaakasparsha, Dr Prakash Baba Amte, and the National Award winning movie Kaccha Limbu.

He has scored music for more than 200 Plays in Marathi, Hindi, Gujarati, English and German. He was also invited by Grips Theater, Germany to compose music for one their initiatives.

Rahul composed music for the World’s Largest Audio book, Dasbodh (दासबोध), penned by Shri Ramdas Swami.  As part of the 100 years of Indian Cinema initiative, he composed music for India’s first film, "Raja Harishchandra" directed by Dadasaheb Phalke

Silent Films 
 Raja Harishchandra
 Kaliya Mardan
 Jamai Babu

Hindi Films 
 2010 – Kaalo
 2010 – Just 47
 2006 – Panga Na Lo
 2005 – Ho Sakta Hai
 2003 – Pran Jaye Par Shaan Na Jaye
 2002 - Pitaah
 2002 - Hathyaar
 2001 – Tera Mera Saath Rahen
 2000 - Nidaan
 2000 – Jis Desh Mein Ganga Rehta Hai
 2000 - Astitva
 1999 - Vaastav
 1999 - Disha

Marathi Films 
 2018 - Ranangan
2016 - Kaccha Limbu
 2016 - Sarpanch Bhagirath
 2014 - Salaam
 2013 – Koknastha
 2013 – Dr Prakash Baba Amte
 2012 – Kaksparsha
 2010 – Sumbaran
 2010 – Samudra
 2010 – Paaradh
 2010 – Jhing Chik Jhing
 2010 – Eka Shabdaat Saangato
 2008 – Dhudgus
 2005 – Sane Guruji
 2005 – Khandobachya Naavana
 2004 – Saatchya Aat Gharaat
 1995 – Aai

Selected Directorial Events

Events 
 2018 - The Masters -  at Shanmukhananda Hall, Mumbai (Ustad Rashid Khan and Shankar Mahadevan in Jugalbandi)
2018 - The Bengal Tigers - Mumbai (A Journey of 4 Iconic Bengali Music Composers, SD Burman, Hemant Kumar, Salil Chowdhury and RD Burman - featuring Sumeet Raghavan, Special Appearance by Asha Bhosle)
 2018 - Viraasat - Pune (featuring Vikku Vinayakram, Selva Ganesh, Louiz Banks, Gino Banks, Ganesh & Kumresh, Taufiq Qureshi and Zakir Hussain - playing as an ensemble)
 2017 - Maifil Shabd Suranchi - Dubai (with Guru Thakur)
2016 - Full Circle - Pune (Journey of 100 years of Marathi Music - featuring Mahesh Kale)
 2016 - Maifil Shabd Suranchi - USA, Switzerland (with Guru Thakur and Sunil Barve)
 2016 - MAAI MICTA 2016 - Sydney
 2015 - My Country My Music - (Design and Direction for Shankar Mahadevan Productions)
 2015 - MICTA 2016
 2015 - Sangeetkar Sammelan
 2015 - Sur Kavitanche
 2014 - MICTA 2014
 2013 - 2014 - Zee SaReGaMaPa Marathi(As Creative Director)
 2013 - MICTA 2013 - Macau
 2012 - Cinema Navacha Manus (Theatrical Biopic of the great film maker V.Shantaram)
 2012 - Garja Maharashtra Maza - Anuj Bidve Fundraiser in London
 2012 - MIFTA 2012 - Singapore (featuring the legendary Asha Bhosle)
 2011 - Nakshatranche Dene - Shravanmasi
 2011 - Nakshatranche Dene - Shrinivas Khale

Awards and recognition

Wins and Nominations 
 2019 - 19th Sanskruti Kaladarpan Gaurav Rajani - Hamlet
2019 - 31st Maharashtra Rajya Marathi Vyavasayik Natya Spardha - Hamlet and Tila Kahi Sangaychay
2018 - Majja Digital Awards - Best Music Director - Kaccha Limbu [Nomination]
2017 - 29th Maharashtra Rajya Marathi Vyavasayik Natya Spardha - Magna Talyakathi
2016 – Mata Sanman - Ha Shekhar Khosla Kon Ahe
 2016 – MICTA Award - Ha Shekhar Khosla Kon Ahe
 2016 - 16th Sanskruti Kaladarpan Gaurav Rajani - Perfect Mismatch
 2016 - 28th Maharashtra Rajya Marathi Vyavasayik Natya Spardha - Perfect Mismatch (3rd)
 2016 – Zee Gaurav - Best Music Director – Ha Shekhar Khosla Kon Ahe [Nomination]
 2010 - 10th Sanskruti Kaladarpan Gaurav - Jhing Chik Jhing [Nomination]
2014 - Kala Gaurav Award
 2014 - Keshavrao Bhole Puraskar
 2014 - Swaranand Puraskar
 2013 - MICTA Award - Du and Me
 2012 - 24th Maharashtra Rajya Marathi Vyavasayik Natya Spardha - Me Revati Deshpande (1st)
 2012 - V. Shantaram Award - Samudra

Media

Loksatta 
 संवाद संवादिनीशी![13 November 2016]
 ‘दिल है छोटासा..’[30 October 2016]
 दिल है छोटासा..[16 October 2016]
 चित्रपट आणि ध्वनी भाग 2 [4 September 2016]
 चित्रपट आणि ध्वनी [14 August 2016]
 चांगल्या चालीचा माणूस भाग 2 [31 July 2016]
 चांगल्या चालीचा माणूस[17 July 2016]
 आधी कोंबडी की..?[3 July 2016]
 नाटय़प्रयोग आणि संगीत[19 June 2016]
 नाटय़ आणि संगीत![5 June 2016]
 विचारवाटा आणि संगीत![22 May 2016]
 पाणघोडा आणि संगीत![8 May 2016]
 पाश्र्व आणि संगीत[24 April 2016]
 M बोले तो.. (भाग २)[10 April 2016]
 ‘M’ बोले तो..[27 March 2016]
 गुरुबिन ग्यान.. भाग २[13 March 2016]
 गुरू बिन ग्यान..[28 February 2016]
 एक तेचि भास्करदा![14 February 2016]
 ‘भाई’ हो तो ऐसा![31 January 2016]
 संगीतातले ‘भाई’[17 January 2016]
 मैफिलीत माझ्या.. : संगीतातले इंटीरिअर डेकोरेटर्स[3 January 2016]

eSakal 
 लंडनमध्ये गरजला "महाराष्ट्र माझा"![7 October 2012]
 अवखळ, अल्लड 'छोटीसी आशा'[4 September 2011]
 माझे गाणे[25 June 2010]
 बिनघोड्याचे जॉकीज्‌![8 January 2011]

Saptahik Sakal 
 मेघ'मल्हार[26 July 2015]

External links

Video 
 Exclusive interview of the music director Rahul Ranade and the director Kiran Yadnyopavit on their latest 'Salaam'[2 May 2014]
 Rahul Ranade talks about Salaam[3 April 2014]
 Rahul Ranade talks about Kaaksparsh[4 May 2012]
 Rahul Ranade's interview on Star Maza by Amit Bhandari [12 August 2010]

Audio 
 
 Rahul Ranade at Reverbnation

Other 
 Loksatta - 'नाटय़रंग : ‘बंध-मुक्त’ उत्कंठावर्धक मीडिया ट्रायल' [28 August 2016]
 Loksatta - 'सहसर्जनाचा डोळस सोहळा' [27 August 2016]
 Loksatta - 'नाटय़रंग : ‘मग्न तळ्याकाठी’ मूल्यांची पडझड अन् पारलौकिकाची ओढ' [4 June 2016]
 Loksatta - ‘आषाढ बार’ : कॅलिडोस्कोपिक सृजनचिकित्सा' [15 May 2016]
 Maharashtra Times - 'गुंग करणारा नात्याखेळ' [15 April 2016]
 Loksatta - ‘हा शेखर खोसला कोण आहे?’ [27 March 2016]
 Loksatta - 'रस्त्यावर उत्सव साजरे करण्याला धर्म समजणे ही चूकच!' [13 February 2016]
 Maharashtra Times - 'परफेक्ट मिसमॅच: अभिनयातून तरारलेला प्रयोग' [29 January 2016]
 eSakal - "सूर कवितांचे" खेडोपाडीही घुमावेत![21 October 2015]
 The Times of India - 'Poetry takes musical route to score high with students' [13 October 2015]
 The Times of India - Gujarat CM launches 'Sanedo' for cleanliness [9 October 2015]
 eSakal - अभ्यासातली 'गाणी' गाऊ चला![14 October 2015]
 The Navhind times - On the edge of the seat[15 April 2015]
 eSakal - आव्वाज कुणाचा... व्हीआयटीचा...[24 March 2015]
 eSakal - चांगला अन्‌ यशस्वी चित्रपट वेगवेगळा[11 January 2015]
 ZeeTalkies - Celebs Speak - Music of the film should take the story ahead: Rahul Ranade[September 2014]
 eSakal - 'मराठी नाटक-चित्रपटांच्या प्रसारासाठी मिक्ता महोत्सव '[21 August 2014]
 Navshakti - 'मराठी नाटक-चित्रपटांचा सर्वत्र प्रसार होण्यासाठीच `मिफ्ता’ महोत्सव – राहूल रानडे'[19 August 2014]
 eSakal - मैदानावर भरला आठवणींचा "क्‍लास"[3 March 2014]
 Rang Marathi - Swwapnil Joshi, Ankush Chaudhari fight for MICTA 2013[9 September 2013]
 My Theater Cafe - Rendezvous with Rahul Ranade: More than music[2 July 2013]
 My Theater Cafe - Du Cultures Meet?[26 May 2013]
 eSakal - विंदा, कुसुमाग्रजांचे साहित्य ऑडिओ बुकच्या स्वरुपात[22 February 2013]
 live mint - Commemoration | Silents please [25 January 2013]
 SoundBox - Q&A with Rahul Ranade[27 August 2012]
 eSakal - हिंदीशी स्पर्धा करणार मराठी रिऍलिटी शोमधील सेट[20 August 1011]
 eSakal -जळगावकरांसाठी सोमवारी 'बाजीराव मस्त मी'चा प्रयोग [2 April 2011]
 eSakal - 'सकाळ'तर्फे गुढीपाडव्यास विनोदी नाटकाची मेजवानी[30 March 2011]
 Dadar Matunga Cultural Center - संगीतकारांची मांदियाळी[December 2010]
 eSakal - उत्तम सादरीकरणाने इंद्रधनुष्य स्पर्धा रंगली[18 November 2010]
 eSakal - 'सुंबरान' चित्रपटाच्या संगीत अल्बमचे प्रकाशन[17 November 2010]
 eSakal - भरकटलेल्या तरुणाईची अचूक "पारख"[29 August 2010]
 eSakal - विनागुरूच्या कलेने ऑडिशन्स फेरी[21 December 2009]

References 
 http://maharashtratimes.indiatimes.com/
 http://www.livemint.com/
 http://timesofindia.indiatimes.com/
 http://www.loksatta.com/?s=rahul+ranade
 http://www.saptahiksakal.com/saptahiksakal/index.htm
 http://online3.esakal.com/
 http://note.taable.com/post/1EE7A2/Kaksparsh/2b-79-3850T-533-8145643T-T4383844
 http://www.loksatta.com/pune-news/keshavrao-bhole-and-manik-varma-awards-declared-1046658/
 http://kiffindia.com/awards.html
 http://navshakti.co.in/
 http://www.tarunbharat.com

1966 births
Living people
Marathi people
Indian film score composers
Music directors
Musicians from Pune
Marathi playback singers
Marathi-language singers
Indian male playback singers
Indian male film score composers